Andrey Romanovich Fedoriv (born August 11, 1963 in Lviv, Ukraine) is a former sprinter from the former Soviet Union, who specialised in the 200 metres.

He was 4 times Soviet Indoor 200 metre champion. He also took 2nd place in the European Cup A in the 200m in 1993.  He was also 3rd in the Euro Cup 200 in 87. In 1986 he won a bronze medal in the 200 metres at the European Championships in Stuttgart.

References 

 

1963 births
Living people
Sportspeople from Lviv
Soviet male sprinters
Russian male sprinters
Olympic male sprinters
Olympic athletes of Russia
Olympic athletes of the Unified Team
Athletes (track and field) at the 1992 Summer Olympics
Athletes (track and field) at the 1996 Summer Olympics
Universiade medalists in athletics (track and field)
Goodwill Games medalists in athletics
Competitors at the 1994 Goodwill Games
Universiade silver medalists for the Soviet Union
Medalists at the 1989 Summer Universiade
World Athletics Championships athletes for Russia
European Athletics Championships medalists
Russian Athletics Championships winners
Soviet Athletics Championships winners
Ukrainian emigrants to Russia